Fox was a basic cable television channel broadcasting in Hungary, operated by Fox Networks Group and launched on 4 February 2014.

History
The launch of Fox in Hungary was announced in October 2013 together with Fox Life and Fox Crime. At the time sister channels National Geographic Channel, NatGeo Wild, and Baby TV were available in Hungary, while Fox was available in several other territories including Austria, the UK, the U.S., Italy, Spain, Portugal, Japan, Germany, North Africa, and Latin America, Fox Life and Fox Crime also being available in territories like Bulgaria, Ukraine, and Croatia. Rodrigo Crespo was chosen as the official voice of the channel. The official YouTube channel of the Hungarian Fox was created in December 2013, while its Facebook page and official site were created in January 2014.

The channel was launched on 4 February 2014 exclusively on the digital platforms of Magyar Telekom, ten days before the Hungarian version of Paramount Channel. Its advertising airtime was sold by Atmedia from 1 March 2014.

On February 1, 2018, Fox announced to launch Fox+, a video on demand service for the Hungarian Fox.

Fox Hungary was shut down on 1 May 2018, After the channel showed a Fox+ Commercial, then played an ident, and froze, The channel ceased operations then. 

Fox+ was eventually discontinued a few months before the launch of Disney+ in Hungary, with its content migrating towards the streaming service when it launched on June 14, 2022.

Programs

Primetime

Reality show/Documentary 
 Man Up
 Tales from the Bush Larder
 Top Tables, Top Cities
 The Wine Quest: Spain

References

External links

                   

Television networks in Hungary
Defunct television channels in Hungary
Television channels and stations established in 2014
2014 establishments in Hungary
Television channels and stations disestablished in 2018
Mass media in Budapest